Kyauktawgyi Pagoda (also known as the Taungthaman Kyauktawgyi) is a Buddhist pagoda located in Amarapura, Burma, near the Taungthaman Lake. It was built in 1847 by King Pagan Min on the model of the Ananda Pagoda at Pagan. 

It exemplifies a type of architecture, which though borrowed from the Indian designs at Pagan, was constructed entirely by Burmese architects. The artistic interest of the temple lies in the numerous frescoes with which its four porches are adorned. They represent religious buildings, in various styles of architecture, built or repaired by Pagan Min at Sagaing, Amarapura, Ava, Pakangyi, Prome, and Rangoon, and the planets and the constellations according to Burmese ideas of astronomy. The human figures depict the dresses and customs of the Konbaung period. The pagoda is crowned with a five-tiered pyatthat roof.

Notes

References

Pagodas in Myanmar
Buildings and structures in Mandalay Region
Religious buildings and structures completed in 1847
1847 establishments in Burma